King Jìng of Zhou,, personal name  Ji Gai, was the twenty-sixth king of the Chinese Zhou dynasty and the fourteenth of Eastern Zhou.  He ruled from 519 BC to 477 BC.  He was succeeded by his son, Prince Ren, who ruled as King Yuan of Zhou from 476 BC to 469 BC.

Ancestry

See also
 Family tree of ancient Chinese emperors

477 BC deaths
Zhou dynasty kings
5th-century BC Chinese monarchs
6th-century BC Chinese monarchs
Year of birth unknown